The Beimen Crystal Church is a church in Beimen District, Tainan, Taiwan. The church was opened in October 2014. Despite the name, it is not consecrated as a church, but is occasionally used as a chapel for weddings.

Architecture
The church was designed with transparent color decorated with many outdoor art installations located at the side of a lake. It features a square stone in the shape of piano. The visitor center is painted with various love-shaped theme artworks.

Transportation
The church is accessible by bus from Xinying Station of Taiwan Railways.

See also
 Christianity in Taiwan

References

2014 establishments in Taiwan
Churches in Tainan
Churches completed in 2014